Acharya Tarini Charan Patra (1901 – 4 March 1979) was a renowned Odissi musician, Guru, singer, scholar, poet, composer & Binākara (exponent of Odissi Bina). One of the most eminent artistes of Odissi classical music in the 20th century, he was known for his vocal renditions & Bina recitals on gramophone records & over the All India Radio, as well as his pioneering efforts in institutionalizing the training of Odissi music by setting up one of the earliest music universities in erstwhile Odisha, the Gandhiji Sangita Kalamandira at Boirani, Ganjam that remained active from 1940 until Patra's demise in 1979.

He began his musical training first from his elder brother, who taught him Odissi, Chhanda, Champu and the various facets of Odissi music. He then continued higher training (in vocal and Bina) under Guru Gaurahari Mahapatra of Pailipada, Bhanjanagar. Drawn towards Vaishnava practices, Patra developed a dispassionate attitude (vairagya) towards worldly affairs and started a Sankirtana group called 'Bhaja Gobinda'''. Soon his fame as a singer spread across Ganjam, with multiple students learning from him and branches of Bhaja Gobinda being established in various places. Several miraculous incidents record Patra's spiritual attainments, including an incident where Mahaprabhu Jagannatha informed his head priest in a dream that he had "gone away to Boirani to listen to Patra's Kirtana". Patra burst out into a song at the head priest's arrival - "ଆଉ କି ଦେଖିବ ନୟନ ମୋ ବାଇମନ, ବୋଇରାଣୀ ଗ୍ରାମ ବଇକୁଣ୍ଠ ଧାମ ହରିନାମେ ପରିପୂର୍ଣ୍ଣ". Events such as these spread Patra's fame across the state. For his mastery over eight disciplines (vocal music, Bina, Mardala, musicology, sahitya-explanation, poetry-music composition and others) he was awarded the title of Astabadhani by the Khallikote rajasabhā after almost a month of rigorous tests, conditions of which included minimal sleep and continuous demanding performances. In 1940, he established an institution called Sangita Kalamandira at his hometown Boirani (now Kabisuryanagar) for imparting systematic education in Odissi music. At the time, it was the first musical institute in all of South Odisha. Patra received encouragement from Ramachandra Mardaraja, the king of Khallikote and Sadashiva Tripathy, then Chief Minister of Odisha. Traditionally, Odissi music was taught in the ancient gurukula system or at temples, mathas, jagas & akhadas. The concept of a formal institution only for musical education was quite new for the region. The institute was later renamed to Gandhiji Sangita Kalamandira in honour of Mahatma Gandhi. Among his disciples (alumni of Kalamandira) are Odissi Bina exponent Guru Ramarao Patra.

Patra is the author of several books on Odissi music, the best-known of them being Odisi Sangita Prakasa (1970) and Sri Gitagobindara Swaralipi containing the first complete notation of all 24 ashtapadis of Jayadeva's Gitagovinda, which is a cornerstone of the Odissi music tradition.

For his efforts, he received the Odisha Sangeet Natak Akademi award in 1972.

 See also 

 Odissi music
 Mardala
 Gita Govinda
 Gitaprakasa''

References 

1901 births
1979 deaths
Odissi music composers
Odissi music
Recipients of the Odisha Sangeet Natak Akademi award